Leah Ayres Kalish (born Leah Simpson; May 28, 1957) is an American actress, best known for her role as Janice Kent in the sports thriller Bloodsport and as Valerie Bryson on the daytime serial The Edge of Night. Kalish is a Master Yoga Teacher, Family Constellations practitioner and coauthor of children's books.

Education
Kalish attended both Tufts University and New York University, earning a degree in dance from the latter. Ayres also earned an M.A. degree in human development from Pacific Oaks College in Pasadena, California in 1996.

Certifications
Kalish is a certified family constellations facilitator, Embodied language processing (embodiment process) practitioner, and Yoga Alliance Registered Master Yoga Teacher. She is a proponent of social-emotional education and teaching integrated yoga and mindfulness in schools. She and her husband Bruce Kalish are founders of a family constellations and inherited family trauma facilitation practice based in Los Angeles.

Television
Ayres' first major role was as Valerie Bryson on the daytime serial The Edge of Night in the early 1980s. In 1984, she starred in Velvet, an ABC/Aaron Spelling television movie opposite Sheree J. Wilson, Shari Belafonte and Mary Margaret Humes. In primetime, she co-starred as Linda Bowman on the abbreviated third season of ABC's 9 to 5. She also played Jill Schrader on the HBO original comedy 1st & Ten in 1986-87.

In 1990 she replaced Maureen McCormick for the role of Marcia Brady on the short-lived series The Bradys. She also made guest appearances on such series as Hotel, The Love Boat, Fantasy Island, Married... with Children and Who's the Boss?. In 1995, she had a recurring role as Tara Flynn on three episodes of Walker, Texas Ranger.

Film
Ayres starred in Bloodsport (1988) alongside Jean-Claude Van Damme and played Michelle in the 1981 film The Burning. She also appeared in Eddie Macon's Run (1983).

Filmography

References

External links
 
 

1957 births
Living people
American film actresses
American television actresses
Actresses from Baltimore
20th-century American actresses
21st-century American women